I'm Gonna Pin My Medal on the Girl I Left Behind is a World War I era song about a soldier named Johnny dreaming of coming home and giving his medal to his sweetheart. The song was first featured in Ziegfeld Follies of 1918. It reached the top 20 in August 1918 and climbed even higher to number 14 in September 1918. It was written and composed by Irving Berlin, produced by Waterson, Berlin & Snyder Co., and recorded by the Peerless Quartet.

References 

1918 songs
Songs written by Irving Berlin